The 1970 New South Wales Rugby Football League premiership was the 63rd season of Sydney's professional rugby league football competition, Australia's first. Twelve teams, including six foundation clubs and another six admitted post 1908, competed for the J. J. Giltinan Shield during the season which culminated in a grand final match for the WD & HO Wills Cup between the Manly-Warringah and South Sydney clubs.

Season summary
Following the previous season's "lay-down" or "stop-start" grand final, rugby league's rules were changed for this season so that rather than stopping the game to call a doctor onto the field when a player goes down injured, the ball is given to a team-mate to play so that no advantage can be gained from feigning injury. Head-high tackles were also outlawed at the commencement of the 1971 season. Each side met all others twice in twenty-two regular season rounds before the top four finishers, Souths, Manly, St. George and Canterbury, fought out four finals for a place in the grand final.

The 1970 season's Rothmans Medallist was Eastern Suburbs' halfback Kevin Junee. Rugby League Week awarded their player of the year award to Cronulla-Sutherland's halfback Tommy Bishop.

Teams

Ladder

Finals

Grand Final

Having lost the previous Grand Final to Balmain, Souths was desperate to win this year. After four minutes the Rabbitohs had scored. Approximately five minutes later Souths captain John Sattler collapsed, having been punched in an off-the-ball incident by Manly forward John Bucknall. He suffered a double fracture to his jaw but pleaded to team mate Mike Cleary, "Hold me up so they don't know I'm hurt". He was helped up and continued to play in the game. At half-time Souths was leading 12–6 when his teammates learnt about his injury.

During the interval Sattler refused treatment and insisted he continue playing. He also told the side, "the next bloke who tries to cut me out of the play is in trouble", to prevent his team mates trying to protect him from further injury. The Souths forward pack returned to the fray and completely dominated the play with its backline hardly called upon. Bucknall had been replaced by Allan Thomson in the 35th minute after a sustained punitive attention from the Rabbitohs pack saw him suffer a shoulder injury in a heavy tackle.

South Sydney halfback Bob Grant opened the scoring in the fourth minute, crossing untouched while his opposite number Eddie Whiley was off the field having an injury treated. Rabbitohs winger Ray Branighan also crossed untouched six minutes from full-time. By game's end South Sydney had scored three tries to nil in a 23–12 victory. Sattler later went to hospital to receive treatment but only after receiving the J. J. Giltinan Shield and making an acceptance speech.

Eric Simms' record of four field-goals that day stands as the most ever kicked in a Grand Final.

 South Sydney 23 (Tries: Grant 2, R Branighan. Goals: Simms 3. Field Goals: Simms 4)

defeated

 Manly-Warringah 12 (Goals: Batty 4. Field Goals: Fulton 2)

Player statistics
The following statistics are as of the conclusion of Round 22.

Top 5 point scorers

Top 5 try scorers

Top 5 goal scorers

References

External links
 Rugby League Tables – Season 1970 The World of Rugby League
1970 Grand Final at eraofthebiff.com
Results:1961-70 at rabbitohs.com.au
1970 J J Giltinan Shield and WD & HO Wills Cup at rleague.com
NSWRFL season 1970 at rugbyleagueproject.com

New South Wales Rugby League premiership
NSWRFL season